Souk El Sagha is one of the souks in the medina of Tunis. It is specialized in the selling of gold products.

Location 
It is located in the east of Al-Zaytuna Mosque, near Souk El Berka.

History 
It was founded during the Hafsid era between 1228 and 1535.

References 

Sagha